Delgaudio or DelGaudio is a surname. Notable people with the surname include:

Derek DelGaudio, American performance artist, writer, and magician
Eugene Delgaudio (born 1955), American politician and conservative activist

Surnames of Italian origin